Struggle for the Soil is a 1925 German silent film directed by Erich Waschneck and starring Gustav Oberg, Ferdinand von Alten, and Oskar Marion. It is based on the classic novel From My Farming Days by Fritz Reuter.

The film's art direction was by Botho Hoefer, Hans Minzloff, and Bernhard Schwidewski. It was shot on location in Lensahn in Holstein.

Cast

References

Bibliography

External links

1925 films
Films of the Weimar Republic
Films directed by Erich Waschneck
German silent feature films
UFA GmbH films
Films based on German novels
German black-and-white films
Films set in Germany